Convercent is a Denver, Colorado-based software company that helps companies design and implement compliance programs. The company's Convercent governance, risk management and compliance (GRC) software integrates the management of corporate compliance risk, cases, disclosures, training and policies.

Software
The company's software is delivered using the software as a service model.

Funding
In January 2013, Convercent received $10.2 million in funding, led by Azure Capital Partners and Mantucket Capital and with participation from City National Bank.

In October 2013, Convercent raised $10M in Series B funding led by Sapphire Ventures] (formerly SAP Ventures), with participation from existing investors Azure Capital Partners, Rho Capital Partners, and Mantucket Capital.

Customers
Convercent has hundreds of customers in more than 130 countries, including Philip Morris International, CH2M Hill and Under Armour.

History
In March 2021, Convercent was acquired by Atlanta-based “trust intelligence” software company, OneTrust.

References

Risk management software
Companies based in Denver